The Modern Lovers were an American rock band led by Jonathan Richman in the 1970s and 1980s. The original band existed from 1970 to 1974 but their recordings were not released until 1976 or later. It featured Richman and bassist Ernie Brooks with drummer David Robinson (later of The Cars) and keyboardist Jerry Harrison (later of Talking Heads). The sound of the band owed a great deal to the influence of the Velvet Underground, and is now sometimes classified as "proto-punk". It pointed the way towards much of the punk rock, new wave, alternative and indie rock music of later decades. Their only album, the eponymous The Modern Lovers, contained idiosyncratic songs about dating awkwardness, growing up in Massachusetts, love of life, and the USA.

Later, between 1976 and 1988, Richman used the name Modern Lovers for a variety of backing bands, always billed as "Jonathan Richman and The Modern Lovers". These bands were quieter and featured more low-key, often near-childlike songs as Richman drew on folk-rock and other genres. Of Richman's original bandmates, only Robinson was part of any of the other Modern Lovers incarnations.

The original Modern Lovers, 1970–1974
Richman grew up in Natick, Massachusetts, a suburb of Boston, and began playing guitar and writing songs in his mid-teens, first performing solo in public in 1967. He became enamored of the Velvet Underground while he was still in high school, and after graduating in 1969, he moved to New York City where he became personally acquainted with the band and on one occasion opened the bill for them. Richman spent a couple of weeks sleeping on Velvets’ manager Steve Sesnick's sofa before moving into the Hotel Albert, a residence known for its poor conditions.

After nine months in New York, and a trip to Europe and Israel, Richman moved back to his native Boston. With his childhood friend, guitarist John Felice, he organized a band modeled after the Velvets. They quickly recruited drummer David Robinson and bass player Rolfe Anderson, and christened themselves "The Modern Lovers". They played their first date, supporting Andy Paley’s band the Sidewinders, in September 1970, barely a month after Richman's return. By this time their setlist already included such noted Richman songs as "Roadrunner", "She Cracked" and "Hospital". Richman's unique character was immediately apparent; he wore short hair and often performed wearing a jacket and tie, and frequently improvised new lyrics and monologues.

In early 1971 Anderson and Felice departed; they were replaced by Harvard students bassist Ernie Brooks, and keyboardist Jerry Harrison, completing the classic lineup of the Modern Lovers. This new configuration became very popular in the Boston area, and by the fall of 1971, enthusiastic word-of-mouth led to the Modern Lovers' first exposure to a major label when Stuart Love of Warner Bros. Records contacted them and organized the band's first multi-track session at Intermedia Studio in Boston. The demo produced from this session, and the group's live performances, generated more attention from the industry, including rave reviews from critic Lillian Roxon, and soon A&M Records was interested in the band as well.

In April 1972, the Modern Lovers traveled to Los Angeles where they held two demo sessions: the first was produced by the Velvet Underground's John Cale for Warner Bros. while the second was produced by Allan Mason for A&M. These sessions were later used on the band's debut album. While in California the band also performed live, and one gig at the Long Branch Saloon in Berkeley was later issued as a live album. Producer Kim Fowley courted the band, traveling to Boston to produce some poor-quality demos in June 1972. Felice rejoined the group for a few months after his graduation, and the band moved together to live in Cohasset, Massachusetts.

The Modern Lovers continued to be a popular live attraction, and on New Year's Eve 1972 supported the New York Dolls at the Mercer Arts Center on a bill which also included Suicide and Wayne County. Early in 1973 they were finally signed by Warner Brothers. However, before returning to the studio in Los Angeles to work with Cale, the group accepted an offer to play a residency at the Inverurie Hotel in Bermuda, owned by the family of a friend of Ernie Brooks. While there, Richman heard and became strongly influenced by the laid-back style of the local musicians, as documented in his later song "Monologue About Bermuda". There were also growing personality clashes among band members.

Although on the band's return Richman agreed to record his earlier songs, he was anxious to move in a different musical direction. He wanted to scrap all of the tracks they had recorded and start over with a mellower, more lyrical sound. The rest of the band, while not opposed to such a shift later, insisted that they record as they sounded now. However, the sessions with Cale in September 1973 also coincided with the death of their friend Gram Parsons (a former Harvard student, like Harrison and Brooks), and produced no usable recordings. The record company then recruited Kim Fowley to produce more sessions with the band, this time at Gold Star Studios, with better results. Recordings from these sessions with Fowley were later released in 1981 on an album titled The Original Modern Lovers (reissued on CD by Bomp Records in 2000).

Break-up and release of first album
Following the failure to complete a debut album, Warner Brothers withdrew their support for The Modern Lovers, and Robinson left the band. They continued to perform live for a few months with new drummer Bob Turner, but Richman was increasingly unwilling to perform his old (although still unreleased) songs such as "Roadrunner", and after a final disagreement between him and Harrison over musical style the band split up in February 1974.

Despite the original group's premature break-up, many of its members found considerable success elsewhere: founding member John Felice formed The Real Kids, Jerry Harrison later joined Talking Heads, David Robinson co-founded The Cars, and Ernie Brooks would later work with David Johansen, Arthur Russell, Elliott Murphy, and Gary Lucas.

Richman continued recording on his own, eventually moving to California in 1975 to begin working with Beserkley Records whose boss Matthew King Kaufman had met Richman when he worked with A&M. While Richman never returned to the Velvets-inspired sound of the original Modern Lovers, the demo recordings made with that group eventually surfaced in various formats. The first of these releases came in 1976 when Beserkley compiled a posthumous LP from the first two demo sessions produced by Cale and Mason; issued on Beserkley's Home of the Hits subsidiary, the album was simply titled The Modern Lovers and included celebrated tracks such as "Roadrunner", "She Cracked", and "Pablo Picasso".

Richman did not recognize this compilation as his "first album," preferring to recognize his debut as 1976's Jonathan Richman and the Modern Lovers, an album pursuing the lighter, softer direction he had in mind with a completely different band (the two collections were released within months of each other). However, The Modern Lovers was given an enthusiastic critical reception, with critic Ira Robbins hailing it as "one of the truly great art rock albums of all time", and it influenced numerous aspiring punk rock musicians on both sides of the Atlantic, including the Sex Pistols (who covered "Roadrunner" on The Great Rock 'n' Roll Swindle).

Jonathan Richman and the Modern Lovers, 1976–1988
In early 1976, Richman put together a new version of The Modern Lovers, with Leroy Radcliffe (guitar), Greg 'Curly' Keranen (bass) and the returning David Robinson (drums). Keranen had previously played with The Rubinoos, and Radcliffe with Woody's Truckstop. They recorded the album Jonathan Richman & The Modern Lovers (1976), but Robinson again left after Richman persisted in reducing the size and volume of his drum kit, and was replaced by D. Sharpe. This band recorded the album Rock 'n' Roll with the Modern Lovers (1977) and toured until Keranen left to go to college and was replaced by Asa Brebner, who played on the albums The Modern Lovers Live (1978) and Back in Your Life (1979). David "D." Sharpe died in 1987, aged 39.

In 1980 Richman again formed a new Modern Lovers, with Keranen, drummer Michael Guardabascio and backing singers Ellie Marshall and Beth Harrington. They recorded the album Jonathan Sings! in 1981/82, but it was not released until 1983. The group toured to support the album, often regarded as one of Richman's best, but split up after Keranen again left in 1984.

The final incarnation of The Modern Lovers, with Andy Paley, Brennan Totten and (initially) Asa Brebner again, toured and recorded between 1985 and 1988. Richman finally retired The Modern Lovers name after the album Modern Lovers 88.

Richman continues to perform, often solo and preferring acoustic instruments, and currently has no plans to undertake another group like his original band. A tribute album consisting primarily of Modern Lovers songs, If I Were a Richman: a Tribute to the Music of Jonathan Richman, was released by Wampus Multimedia in 2001.  Asa Brebner died in 2019, aged 65.

Influence
The Modern Lovers band was influential on the then-burgeoning punk rock and later new wave and indie musical styles, as viewed in the feature-length 2015 documentary Danny Says.

John Cale, Iggy Pop and David Bowie have all covered "Pablo Picasso"; it was also covered by Los Angeles-area rock band Burning Sensations for the soundtrack of the 1984 Alex Cox film Repo Man; additionally the song was covered by the English post-punk band Television Personalities on their album Don't Cry Baby, It's Only a Movie.

Seminal punk group the Sex Pistols covered "Roadrunner" on The Great Rock 'n' Roll Swindle. Joan Jett sang "Roadrunner" on her cover album, The Hit List. In 2009 Titus Andronicus covered "Roadrunner" on its EP The Innocents Abroad – Live in London 23/02/09; this recording was subsequently included on the fan compilation Feats of Strength. Additional covers of "Roadrunner" include those by Wire and Richman's labelmates The Greg Kihn Band.

English rock band Echo & the Bunnymen covered "She Cracked" live on Crystal Days in 1985, although with some altered lyrics. Post-punk act Siouxsie and the Banshees released "She Cracked" as the extra b-side of "This Wheel's on Fire" 1987 double-pack 7-inch, collected on Downside Up. Additionally, American grunge band Seaweed covered "She Cracked" on the John Peel Sub-Pop Sessions album, in 1994.

More recently, Aloe Blacc performed the band's "New Kind of Neighborhood" in a series of television advertisements for Google.

Discography

Albums

The Modern Lovers

Singles

Jonathan Richman and The Modern Lovers

Singles
 Jonathan Richman & the Modern Lovers: "New England" / "Here Come the Martian Martians" (Beserkley B-5743, US, 1976)
 Jonathan Richman: "Roadrunner (Once)" / The Modern Lovers: "Roadrunner (Twice)" (Beserkley BZZ1, UK, 1977) (UK #11)
 Jonathan Richman & the Modern Lovers: "Egyptian Reggae" / "Roller Coaster by the Sea" (Beserkley BZZ2, UK, 1977) (UK #5)
 Jonathan Richman & the Modern Lovers: "The Morning of Our Lives" / "Roadrunner (Thrice)" (Beserkley BZZ7, UK, 1977) (UK #29)
 Jonathan Richman & the Modern Lovers: "New England" / "Astral Plane" (Beserkley BZZ14, UK, 1977)
 Jonathan Richman & the Modern Lovers: "Abdul & Cleopatra" / "Oh Carol" (Beserkley BZZ19, UK, 1978)
 Jonathan Richman & the Modern Lovers: "Buzz Buzz Buzz" / "Hospital (live)" (Beserkley BZZ25, UK, 1978)
 Jonathan Richman & the Modern Lovers: "Lydia" / "Important In Your Life" (Beserkley BZZ28, UK, 1979)
 Jonathan Richman & the Modern Lovers: "That Summer Feeling" / "This Kind of Music" (Rough Trade RT 152, UK, 1984)
 Jonathan Richman & the Modern Lovers: "I'm Just Beginning To Live" / "Shirin and Fahrad" (Rough Trade RT 154, UK, 1985)

Line-up 

 Jonathan Richman – vocals, guitar (1970–1974, 1976–1988)
 David Robinson – drums, backing vocals (1970–1973, 1976)
 John Felice – guitar (1970–1971)
 Rolfe Anderson – bass (1970–1971)
 Ernie Brooks – bass, backing vocals (1971–1974)
 Jerry Harrison – keyboards, backing vocals (1971–1974)
 Bob Turner – drums (1973–1974)
 Leroy Radcliffe – guitar, backing vocals (1976–1979)
 Greg 'Curly' Keranen – bass, backing vocals (1976–1977, 1980–1984)
 Denotra 'D' Sharpe – drums, backing vocals (1976–1979)
 Asa Brebner – bass, backing vocals (1977–1979), guitar (1985–1986)
 Andy Paley – guitar, backing vocals (1979, 1985–1986), keyboards, drums (1984–1985)
 Steve Tracey – backing vocals (1979)
 Michael Guardabascio – drums (1980–1986)
 Ellie Marshall – backing vocals (1980–1986)
 Beth Harrington – backing vocals (1980–1984)
 Ken Forfia – keyboards (1982–1984)
 Ned Claflin – backing vocals, accordion (1984–1986)
 Brennan Totten – guitar, backing vocals (1986–1988)
 Johnny Avila – drums, backing vocals (1986–1988)

References

External links
Simes' Jonathan Richman Pages includes a comprehensive Modern Lovers Discography.
Website for Greg Keranen aka "João Dilberto"
The Bostonians – article by Keith Gessen
 

Protopunk groups
Garage rock groups from Massachusetts
Musical groups established in 1970
Natick, Massachusetts
Musical groups from Boston
Bomp! Records artists
Sire Records artists
Rough Trade Records artists
Virgin Records artists
Rounder Records artists
1970 establishments in Massachusetts